Meesiaceae is a family of mosses belonging to the order Splachnales.

Genera:
 Amblyodon P.Beauv.
 Diplocomium F.Web. & D.Mohr
 Meesia Hedw.
 Neomeesia Deguchi
 Paludella Ehrh. ex Brid.

References

Splachnales
Moss families